Sundays Well Rugby Football Club is a rugby union team in Cork City, Ireland. Originally founded in 1906 in the Sunday's Well area on the northside of Cork city, it has been based at Musgrave Park on the city's southside since the mid-20th century. The club's senior team competes in Division 2C of the Energia All Ireland League.

History

The club was first formed in 1906, however through lack of funds and permanent grounds, it was dissolved at the end of the 1907/1908 season. At the beginning of the 1910/1911 season however, it re-surfaced only for it to disband again three seasons later at the outbreak of the First World War. During that war quite a number of the club members were killed in the conflict. The club, in its present-day format, was re-activated in 1923, and progressed to rented grounds at Houndsditch, Clogheen, Cork City, and then to grounds at Shanakiel, Cork City (the committee and dressing rooms were in a building at the foot of Shanakiel Hill). It was during the 1941/1942 season that the club moved to its current home in Musgrave Park, Cork City. In 1960 the present clubhouse was opened with an extension being added in 1981.

The club has an under age section with teams competing at all levels in local South Munster leagues.  Teams train in Musgrave Park and in local amenities supporting the numbers.

Notable former players
 David Corkery
 John Lacey
 Sean McCahill
 Pat O'Hara
 Rory Parata
 Donnacha Ryan

References

External links
 

 
Rugby clubs established in 1906
Irish rugby union teams
Rugby union clubs in County Cork
Senior Irish rugby clubs (Munster)
1906 establishments in Ireland